"Love Is Easy" is a song by the British power pop band, Badfinger. Released on their album, Badfinger, the song was written by one of the band's guitarists, Joey Molland.

Release

"Love Is Easy" was released on the 1974 Badfinger album, on which it was the third track. During the previous October 1973, it was released as a single in Britain (as well as in Germany, New Zealand, South Africa and Uruguay), backed with the Mike Gibbins-written track, "My Heart Goes Out" (also on the Badfinger album.) It was a commercial failure, however, not charting in the UK. A second single from Badfinger, "I Miss You", was released in America and Japan, but that single still did not garner any commercial appeal.

A live version of the song also appeared on the live album BBC in Concert 1972–1973.

Reception

Stephen Thomas Erlewine, a critic from the company AllMusic, said in his review of the Badfinger album that "Love Is Easy" "has a pleasing pop hook."

References

Badfinger songs
Song recordings produced by Chris Thomas (record producer)
Warner Records singles
1973 songs
Songs written by Joey Molland